Cao Jie may refer to:

Cao Jie (eunuch) (died 181), eunuch of the late Han Dynasty
Empress Cao Jie, final empress of Han Dynasty